Liceo linguistico (literally "linguistic lyceum") is a type of secondary school in Italy. It is designed to give students the skills to progress to any university or higher educational institution. Students can attend the liceo linguistico after successfully completing middle school (scuola media).

The curriculum is devised by the Ministry of Education, and emphasises the link between multiculturalism and language learning. It covers a complete and widespread range of disciplines.

Students typically study for five years, and attend the school from the age of 14 to 19. At the end of the fifth year all students sit for the esame di Stato, a final examination which gives access to every university course.

A student attending a liceo is called liceale, although the more generic terms studente (male) and studentessa (female) are also in common use. Teachers are known as professore (male) or professoressa (female).

Subjects
During five years, students learn three foreign languages (including English) and acquire a rich humanistic and scientific culture.

At the end of the final year, the language proficiency of students is minimum B2.

This is the weekly schedule of liceo linguistico in 5 years:

History 
With the D.M. July 31, 1973 is launched as an experimentation in non-statal secondary education institutions On 1 September 2010, with the Gelmini reform the experimental plans, the PNI and the Brocca project were blocked.

Linguistic Experimentation C.M. 27/91 

 133 hours per year were mandatorily done with a native speaker lecturer.
 2The written test of Latin language and literature was scheduled only for the two-year period.

Brocca Project 
The Brocca project was an experiment in which it was possible to enroll up to the 2009-2010 school year; in fact, starting from the 2010-2011 school year, the application of the new timetable frameworks began. The last students enrolled in the Brocca project graduated in the 2013-2014 school year.

 1 33 hours per year were mandatorily done with a native speaker lecturer.

Gelmini reform 
Starting from 1 September 2010, with the implementation of the Gelmini reform, all the high school language experiments and all the previously existing courses have been eliminated, creating a single address of homogeneous linguistic high school at national level. The ministerial offer that can be activated by individual schools, where possible, includes the teaching of the English language, French language, German language, Spanish language, Russian language, Arabic language, Hebrew language, Chinese language, and Japanese language.

Standard study plan
The study plan is as follows:

 1 33 hours per year are mandatorily done with a native speaker lecturer;
 2 With IT during the 1st two-year period;
 3 Fundamentals of Biology, chemistry, natural science.

EsaBac plan

 1 33 hours per year are mandatorily done with a native speaker lecturer;
 2 With IT during the 1st two-year period;
 3 Fundamentals of Biology, chemistry, natural science.

Gelmini reform dissatisfaction
After the reform, in 2010, for two years, Italian students starting to protest in the squares against the reform – according to them – completely not in line with a good educational path.
The Gelmini reform not only deprived students of useful hours but also gave less hours per week to teach the same educational curriculum as pre-reform generating chaos among teachers and lectures. Researches, teachers, and students were – for the very first time – united against the reform on the Italian squares.

Final exam

According to the law, students of the liceo linguistico must sit several written tests alongside a final interdisciplinary oral test. The first written exam is the Italian one, in which the student has to choose one text to analyse between three main categories: a poetic text, an argumentative essay or a contemporary essay. The second written test includes two texts in two languages (English obligatory + another language) to analyse and two essays to write. Finally, there is an oral exam, in which the candidate is tested in several subjects.

EsaBac
If students study French language and literature in an EsaBac course, at the end of high school they must take a French history and French literature exam. Once passed, the students receive the Esame di Stato (the final exam in Italy) and the Baccalauréat (the final exam in France).
The language proficiency of students that attain that exam is minimum B2.

University
After Liceo Linguistico, a student can enter any university faculty (from foreign languages to philosophy, mathematics, physics, medicine, chemistry, etc.). As well as in other licei in Italy, academic preparation is performed from the first to the last year.

See also
List of schools in Italy
Liceo classico
Liceo scientifico

References

Education in Italy
School types